Anneliese Seidel is a retired East German slalom canoeist who competed in the late 1950s. She won a bronze medal in the folding K-1 event at the 1957 ICF Canoe Slalom World Championships in Augsburg.

References
ICF medalists for Olympic and World Championships – Part 2: rest of flatwater (now sprint) and remaining canoeing disciplines: 1936–2007.

East German female canoeists
Living people
Year of birth missing (living people)
Place of birth missing (living people)
Medalists at the ICF Canoe Slalom World Championships